Benjamin Tyler Cook (born December 11, 1997) is an American stage actor. He has appeared on Broadway in Ragtime, Billy Elliot the Musical (for which he was nominated for a Helen Hayes Award), Tuck Everlasting, Mean Girls, and West Side Story. He has also performed in two Broadway national tours, Billy Elliot the Musical and Newsies the Musical, and appeared on television in episodes of 30 Rock, House of Cards, Veep, Law & Order: SVU, and in the HBO film Paterno. He most recently appeared as a Jet in the 2021 film version of West Side Story and as Henry in the HBO Max horror series Pretty Little Liars: Original Sin (2022present).

Early life
Cook was born in Eden, North Carolina, and grew up in New York City and Lorton, Virginia. He is the youngest child of Jill and Glenn Cook. His mother the executive director of the American School Counsellor Association. His father is a photographer, blogger, and publishing consultant.

At the age of seven, Cook began studying dance at the Metropolitan School of the Arts in northern Virginia. He attended the Professional Performing Arts School in New York City for middle school and during high school.

Career

Musical theatre
Cook performed in several productions as a child in Washington, D.C., including at Ford's Theatre and the John F. Kennedy Center for the Performing Arts. He made his Broadway debut at the age of eleven in Ragtime at the Neil Simon Theatre, understudying and performing the role of Edgar (The Little Boy). His next Broadway role was Tall Boy in Billy Elliot the Musical at the Imperial Theatre, and played the roles of Michael, then Billy in the North American National Tour of the production. His final tour performance as "Billy" was in Las Vegas, Nevada, on May 19, 2013.

From the age of 16, he toured for a year and a half in the role of Race and occasionally performed the role of Crutchie as the understudy in the first national tour of Newsies the Musical. In January 2016, after over 500 performances, Cook left that tour and joined the original Broadway cast of Tuck Everlasting. Previews began in March 2016, and the show closed the same May.

Cook joined the ensemble of the musical adaptation of the film Mean Girls. Its pre-Broadway tryout began in October 2017 at the National Theatre, in Washington D.C. The show premiered on Broadway in April 2018. He was set to appear in the 2020 Broadway revival of West Side Story as Riff, the leader of the Jets, but he left the production after being injured in a preview performance.

Film and television
On television, Cook appeared as young Jack on 30 Rock, in the episode "Chain Reaction of Mental Anguish" (2010); and as Walt in the episode of the HBO series Veep titled "The Choice" (2014). He played Heather Dunbar's son in the episode "Chapter 27" of the Netflix series House of Cards (2013). On Law & Order: Special Victims Unit, he played Adam Turner in the episode "Great Expectations" (2017).

Cook reprised his role of Race in Newsies in the film adaptation of the musical, which received a limited release in February 2017 and later on Netflix. In 2018, he appeared in the HBO film Paterno.

He also appeared in the 2021 film adaptation of West Side Story as Mouthpiece, a member of the Jets.

Credits

Theatre

Television and film

Awards

References

External links

1997 births
21st-century American male actors
American male ballet dancers
American male child actors
American male musical theatre actors
American male stage actors
American male television actors
Living people
Male actors from New York City
Male actors from North Carolina
Male actors from Virginia
People from Eden, North Carolina
People from Lorton, Virginia